Geratpur railway station is a railway station under Western Railway zone in Gujarat state, India. It serves Geratpur village. Its code is 'GER'. It has 2 platforms. Passenger, MEMU trains halt here.

Location 

This railway station is located in the village of Geratpur, Daskroi Taluka, Ahmedabad district, Gujarat.

Nearby stations 

 is nearest railway station towards , whereas  is nearest railway station towards .

References 

Railway stations in Ahmedabad district
Vadodara railway division